The Bridgewater Corners Bridge carries Vermont Route 100A across the Ottauquechee River in the Bridgewater Corners village of Bridgewater, Vermont.  It was built in 1928 by the American Bridge Company, following devastating flooding.  It is a single-span Pratt through truss structure, and was listed on the National Register of Historic Places in 1992.

Description and history
The Bridgewater Corners Bridge stands just south of United States Route 4 on Route 100A, and just east of the Long Trail Brewing Company plant. The truss elements are of lighter weight than other bridges of the period, and its trusses are fastened by rivets. The deck is corrugated metal, supported by rolled I-beams.

The state of Vermont was devastated by flooding in 1927, which destroyed a large number of bridges.  This bridge was built the following year by the American Bridge Company, and is based on a standardized design used for many of the bridges built in the period.  It deviates from these in being shorter than typical for Pratt through trusses, and in its use of lighter-weight materials.

See also
National Register of Historic Places listings in Windsor County, Vermont
List of bridges on the National Register of Historic Places in Vermont

References

Road bridges on the National Register of Historic Places in Vermont
National Register of Historic Places in Windsor County, Vermont
Bridges completed in 1928
Bridges in Windsor County, Vermont
Buildings and structures in Bridgewater, Vermont
Metal bridges in the United States
Truss bridges in the United States